Earl Thompson Ingarfield Sr. (born October 25, 1934) is a Canadian former professional ice hockey centre who played in the National Hockey League for thirteen seasons from 1958–59 until 1970–71.

Ingarfield played 746 career NHL games, scoring 179 goals and 226 assists for 405 points. His best offensive season was the 1961–62 season when he set career highs with 26 goals, 31 assists, and 57 points while a member of the New York Rangers. In 1967 he played with the new expansion with the Pittsburgh Penguins and was their captain in 1968–69. Ingarfield was traded to the Oakland Seals in late 1968–69 season and retired with them in 1971.

He served as the second coach for the New York Islanders during their inaugural 1972–73 season. Behind the bench for thirty games, he did not return to the franchise for the 1973-74 campaign.

Ingarfield's son Earl Ingarfield Jr. also played in the NHL.

Career statistics

Regular season and playoffs

Coaching record

Legacy
In the 2009 book 100 Ranger Greats, the authors ranked Ingarfield at No. 79 all-time of the 901 New York Rangers who had played during the team's first 82 seasons.

References

External links 

1934 births
Living people
California Golden Seals players
Canadian expatriate ice hockey players in the United States
Canadian ice hockey centres
Canadian ice hockey coaches
Ice hockey people from Alberta
Lethbridge Broncos coaches
New York Islanders coaches
New York Rangers players
Oakland Seals players
Pittsburgh Penguins players
Regina Pats coaches
Regina Pats players
Sportspeople from Lethbridge
Springfield Indians players
Winnipeg Warriors (minor pro) players